Stelis ophioglossoides is a species of orchid native to east Cuba, French Guiana, the Leeward Islands, Trinidad and Tobago, Venezuela, and the Windward Islands. It is the type species of the genus Stelis.

References 

ophioglossoides
Flora of Cuba
Flora of French Guiana
Flora of the Leeward Islands
Flora of Trinidad and Tobago
Flora of Venezuela
Flora of the Windward Islands
Orchids of South America
Flora without expected TNC conservation status
Plants described in 1800